Christina Ong (née Fu, born October 1947) is a Singaporean businesswoman who owns the COMO Group. As of 2021, Christina and her husband Ong Beng Seng were ranked 25th on Singapore's richest list.

Career
Ong opened a clothing store in 1972, prior to founding the COMO Group, which includes Club 21 fashion stores and COMO Hotels and Resorts.

Ong also owns a significant proportion of Mulberry shares, and a number of properties on Bond Street in London. Her property portfolio includes all Armani outlets in Britain. Ong also holds the franchises for Donna Karen and DKNY.

Ong is a former chairman of Singapore's National Parks Board.

Awards
For her services to the Italian fashion industry, Ong has been awarded the Italian Fashion Hall of Fame Award in 1995 and was conferred the Cavaliere del Lavoro. The Italian Trade Commission said in a press release that the Hall of Fame Award was in recognition of Ong's  accomplishments and leadership skills in the fashion world.

In 2013, she received Singapore's Meritorious Service Medal, one of three awarded that year. The others went to the historian Wang Gungwu and Tony Chew, inaugural chairman of the Duke-NUS Graduate Medical School's governing board.

In 2014, Ong was included in the list of  the inaugural Singapore Women's Hall of Fame, which described her as a "global fashion entrepreneur and luxury hotelier."

In June 2022, she was listed by the International Hospitality Institute as one of the 100 Most Powerful People in Global Hospitality.

Personal life
Born October 1947, Ong is the daughter of Peter Fu Yun Siak, an early employer of her husband and founder of Kuo International. Ong is married to Singaporean business magnate and investor Ong Beng Seng. They have two children, a daughter, Melissa, and a son, Jonathan.

Ong is cited as "one of the wealthiest women in the world". As of January 2016, Ong and her husband have a net worth of $1.9 billion based on estimates by Forbes. This makes the couple among the richest persons in Singapore.

References

1947 births
Living people
Singaporean hoteliers
Singaporean billionaires
Female billionaires